Valery Aleksandrovich Golubev (born June 14, 1952, Leningrad (Saint Petersburg), former Soviet Union)  is a Russian politician and businessman.  He is a former Head of the Vasileostrovsky Administrative District of St. Petersburg, former member of the Federation Council of Russia, and a Deputy CEO Gazprom and the Head of its Department for Construction and Investment. He retired in 2019.

Awards
 Order of Honour (Moldova) (2009)

References

External links 
Biography (in Russian)
"Pensioner from Gazprom" (investigative report by the Anti-Corruption Foundation)
http://www.nakanune.ru/news/2005/09/21/proizvoditeli_i_potrebiteli_neftegazovogo
https://biz.liga.net/pervye-litsa/tek/novosti/uvoleny-dvoe-zamestiteley-glavy-gazproma-za-proigrysh-naftogazu 

Members of Legislative Assembly of Saint Petersburg
Businesspeople from Saint Petersburg
Gazprom people
Living people
1952 births
Members of the Federation Council of Russia (after 2000)
Russian Presidential Academy of National Economy and Public Administration alumni